Cleora taprobana is a moth of the family Geometridae described by David Stephen Fletcher in 1953. It is found in Sri Lanka.

References

Moths of Asia
Moths described in 1953